Kalanchoe laetivirens is a species of Kalanchoe (section Bryophyllum). It is most likely a hybrid between K. daigremontiana and K. laxiflora (syn. Bryophyllum crenatum), and therefore a group of invalid names for such a hybrid, including Kalanchoe crenodaigremontiana, Kalanchoe crenato-daigremontiana, Bryophyllum crenodaigremontianum and Bryophyllum crenato-daigremontianum, are just synonyms of K. laetivirens.

It is often misidentified as one of its parents, K. daigremontiana, which has bands or spots on the back of leaves, while the leaves of K. laetivirens are completely green, as indicated by its epithet laetivirens which means "lushly green".

Gallery

References 

x laetivirens
x laetivirens
Flora of Madagascar
Hybrid plants